Melicope vitiflora, commonly known as northern evodia, fishpoison wood, leatherjacket or leatherwood, is a species of shrub or small tree in the family Rutaceae and is native to north-eastern Australia and New Guinea. It has trifoliate leaves and green to white or cream-coloured flowers borne in panicles in leaf axils.

Description
The flowers are bisexual, male or female, the plants with all male or all females flowers, or dioecious. There are four stamens in the bisexual and male flowers.

Taxonomy
Northern evodia was first described in 1871 by Ferdinand von Mueller who gave it the name Euodia vitiflora and published the description in his book, Fragmenta phytographiae Australiae from a specimen collected near Rockingham Bay by John Dallachy. In 1990, Thomas Gordon Hartley changed the name to Melicope vitiflora in the journal Telopea.

Distribution and habitat
It occurs in New Guinea and from the McIlwraith Range on Cape York Peninsula to Broken Head in far north-eastern New South Wales.

Conservation status
This species is classified as of "least concern" under the Queensland Government Nature Conservation Act 1992.

References

vitiflora
Trees of Australia
Flora of New South Wales
Flora of Queensland
Plants described in 1871
Taxa named by Ferdinand von Mueller